Fernhill  is a village and rural community in the Hastings District and Hawke's Bay Region of New Zealand's North Island. It is located on State Highway 50, north-west of Hastings on the south bank of the Ngaruroro River.

Fernhill was one of the few places in New Zealand where the January 2018 lunar eclipse was visible.

References

Hastings District
Populated places in the Hawke's Bay Region